John Aston (3 September 1921 – 31 July 2003) was an English footballer.

Like his son John Aston Jr., Prestwich-born Aston came through the Manchester United youth system and turned professional in December 1939. His debut for the club came almost seven years later, on 18 September 1946, against Chelsea. Aston was a strong, tough-tackling left-back who also played as a centre forward for his club on occasion. He won 17 England caps between 1948 and 1950, all at left-back, and featured in the 1950 FIFA World Cup. He played in the 1948 FA Cup Final triumph over Blackpool at Wembley Stadium. He left the club in 1954 after scoring 30 goals in 284 appearances.

Aston returned to the club as Youth Team coach in the early 1960s and was then Chief Scout under new manager Wilf McGuinness in 1969, and had a three-year spell in the position before being sacked along with McGuinness's successor, Frank O'Farrell in late 1972. Aston was also reserve team manager when McGuinness was manager, although McGuinness became reserve team manager again after he got sacked as manager in December 1970.

Aston died in July 2003 at the age of 81.

Honours
Manchester United
First Division: 1951–52
FA Cup: 1948

External links
Manchester United profile
England profile
Obituary in The Independent
Obituary in The Times

1921 births
Sportspeople from Prestwich
English footballers
England international footballers
1950 FIFA World Cup players
Manchester United F.C. players
English Football League players
Association football fullbacks
2003 deaths
English Football League representative players
FA Cup Final players